This is a list of characters in animation that either self-identify as bisexual or have been identified by outside parties to be bisexual. Listed characters are either recurring characters, cameos, guest stars, or one-off characters. For the purpose of this article, anime are considered any animations created in Japan and does not include any anime-influenced animation in the United States, Europe, parts of Asia, and elsewhere in the world. Also see the corresponding lists of lesbian and gay characters.

For information about fictional characters in other parts of the LGBTQ community, see the lists of gay, trans, bisexual, non-binary, pansexual, asexual, and intersex characters.

The names are organized alphabetically by surname (i.e. last name), or by single name if the character does not have a surname. If more than two characters are in one entry, the last name of the first character is used.

In the 1960s–1980s

In the 1990s

In the 2000s

In the 2010s

In the 2020s

Notes

See also

 List of bisexual characters in television
 List of polyamorous characters in fiction
 List of animated series with LGBT characters
 List of comedy television series with LGBT characters
 List of dramatic television series with LGBT characters: 1970s–2000s
 List of dramatic television series with LGBT characters: 2010s

References

Citations

Sources
 

 

bisexual
Bisexual in anime